Bacterioplanoides is a bacteria genus from the family of Oceanospirillaceae with one known species (Bacterioplanoides pacificum).

References

Oceanospirillales
Monotypic bacteria genera
Bacteria genera